Anaerosinus glycerini  is a bacterium from the genus of Anaerosinus which has been isolated from freshwater mud in Germany.

References

Further reading

External links
Type strain of Anaerosinus glycerini at BacDive -  the Bacterial Diversity Metadatabase	

Negativicutes
Bacteria described in 1996